Phyllobius is a genus of weevils containing at least 60 described species, some of which are commonly found in Europe.

European species 

 Phyllobius achardi Desbrochers, 1873
 Phyllobius aetolicus Apfelbeck, 1901
 Phyllobius aetolicus aetolicus Apfelbeck, 1901
 Phyllobius aetolicus albanicus Apfelbeck, 1916
 Phyllobius alpinus Stierlin, 1859
 Phyllobius arborator (Herbst, 1797)
 Phyllobius argentatus (Linnaeus, 1758)
 Phyllobius argentatus argentatus (Linnaeus, 1758)
 Phyllobius betulinus (Bechstein & Scharfenberg, 1805)
 Phyllobius betulinus betulinus  (Bechstein & Scharfenberg, 1805)
 Phyllobius betulinus hellenicus Apfelbeck, 1916
 Phyllobius brenskei Schilsky, 1911
 Phyllobius brevis Gyllenhal, 1834
 Phyllobius bulgaricus Apfelbeck, 1916
 Phyllobius calcaratus (Fabricius, 1792)
 Phyllobius canus Gyllenhal, 1834
 Phyllobius contemptus Schoenherr, 1832
 Phyllobius crassipes Motschulsky, 1860
 Phyllobius cupreoaureus Stierlin, 1861
 Phyllobius cylindricollis Gyllenhal, 1834
 Phyllobius dispar Redtenbacher, 1849
 Phyllobius dispar dispar Redtenbacher, 1849
 Phyllobius dispar merditanus Apfelbeck, 1916
 Phyllobius emeryi Desbrochers, 1873
 Phyllobius emgei Stierlin, 1887
 Phyllobius etruscus Desbrochers, 1873
 Phyllobius euchromus Reitter, 1885
 Phyllobius fessus Boheman, 1843
 Phyllobius flecki Reitter, 1906
 Phyllobius fulvago Gyllenhal, 1834
 Phyllobius fulvagoides Reitter, 1885
 Phyllobius ganglbaueri Apfelbeck, 1916
 Phyllobius glaucus (Scopoli, 1763)
 Phyllobius haberhaueri Apfelbeck, 1916
 Phyllobius insidiosus Pesarini, 1981
 Phyllobius insulanus Schilsky, 1911
 Phyllobius jacobsoni Smirnov, 1913
 Phyllobius korbi Schilsky, 1908
 Phyllobius lateralis Reiche, 1857
 Phyllobius lateralis lateralis Reiche, 1857
 Phyllobius lateralis stierlinensis Desbrochers, 1873
 Phyllobius leonisi Pic, 1902
 Phyllobius longipilis Boheman, 1843
 Phyllobius maculicornis Germar, 1824
 Phyllobius maculicornis lucanus Solari & Solari, 1903
 Phyllobius maculicornis maculicornis Germar, 1824
 Phyllobius meschniggi Solari, 1938
 Phyllobius montanus Miller, 1862
 Phyllobius noesskei Apfelbeck, 1916
 Phyllobius nudiamplus Reitter, 1916
 Phyllobius nudiamplus pinkeri Voss, 1964
 Phyllobius oblongus (Linnaeus, 1758)
 Phyllobius pallidus (Fabricius, 1792)
 Phyllobius pellitus Boheman, 1843
 Phyllobius peneckei Solari, 1931
 Phyllobius pilicornis Desbrochers, 1873
 Phyllobius pilipes Desbrochers, 1873
 Phyllobius pomaceus Gyllenhal, 1834
 Phyllobius pyri (Linnaeus, 1758)
 Phyllobius pyri italicus Solari & Solari, 1903
 Phyllobius pyri pyri (Linnaeus, 1758)
 Phyllobius pyri reicheidius Desbrochers, 1873
 Phyllobius quercicola Apfelbeck, 1916
 Phyllobius raverae Solari & Solari, 1903
 Phyllobius rhodopensis Apfelbeck, 1898
 Phyllobius roboretanus Gredler, 1882
 Phyllobius rochati Pesarini, 1981
 Phyllobius romanus Faust, 1890
 Phyllobius schatzmayri Pesarini, 1981
 Phyllobius seladonius Brullé, 1832
 Phyllobius squamosus C. Brisout, 1866
 Phyllobius subdentatus Boheman, 1843
 Phyllobius thalassinus Gyllenhal, 1834
 Phyllobius transsylvanicus Stierlin, 1894
 Phyllobius tuberculifer Chevrolat, 1865
 Phyllobius valonensis Apfelbeck, 1916
 Phyllobius versipellis Apfelbeck, 1916
 Phyllobius vespertilio Faust, 1884
 Phyllobius vespertilio quercetorum Arnoldi, 1965
 Phyllobius vespertinus (Fabricius, 1792)
 Phyllobius virideaeris (Laicharting, 1781)
 Phyllobius virideaeris cinereipennis Gyllenhal, 1834
 Phyllobius virideaeris padanus Pesarini, 1975
 Phyllobius virideaeris pedestris Schilsky, 1911
 Phyllobius virideaeris virideaeris (Laicharting, 1781)
 Phyllobius viridicollis (Fabricius, 1792)
 Phyllobius xanthocnemus Kiesenwetter, 1852

See also
 List of Phyllobius species

Gallery

References 

 Phyllobius entry at the Global Biodiversity Information Facility.
 Fauna europaea

External links 

Entiminae
Articles containing video clips